Katy Cropper is a Welsh shepherdess and dog trainer.

A self-taught sheepdog handler, Cropper told First Women in 2016 that she had been "deliberately marked down or penalised [by men] to keep me from winning".  Then, in 1990, she (with her dog Trim) was the first woman to win the BBC's One Man and His Dog sheepdog trials television series (Chirk Castle).  Twenty-five years later, her daughter—Henrietta Cropper—was a finalist on the programme.  , Cropper was a sheep dog trainer.

References

20th-century Welsh women
21st-century Welsh women
dog trainers
people from Llandudno
shepherds
Welsh award winners